James Joseph Norris was an American advocate for refugees and migrants. The first president of the International Catholic Migration Commission, he oversaw the assistance given to more than 200,000 migrants and refugees between 1951-74. A personal friend of both Pope Paul VI and later Mother Teresa, he was the first layperson to address the Second Vatican Council in 1963, where he spoke on the topic of world poverty and the Christian conscience. He was also the Holy See's official representative to the funeral of Dr. Martin Luther King, Jr. He was awarded the UNHCR's highest humanitarian award, known as the Nansen Refugee Award in 1975.

Honorary Degrees
 St. John's University (New York City), Doctor of Humane Letters (June 14, 1964)
 Seton Hall University, Doctor of Laws (June 5, 1965)
 Catholic University of America, Doctor of Humane Letters (June 6, 1965)
 Georgetown University, Doctor of Laws (June 5, 1967)

References

Sources

External links
James J. Norris - Vatican Council II Collection - Biographical Note
Norris, James Joseph (Encyclopedia.com)

1907 births
1976 deaths
Catholic University of America alumni
People from Roselle Park, New Jersey
United States Navy reservists
Commanders Crosses of the Order of Merit of the Federal Republic of Germany
Nansen Refugee Award laureates